Plessey was a British electronics company.

It can also refer to:
 Plessey Code, a British barcode system
 Plessey System 250, a computer system that implements capability based addressing
 Plessey railway station, a disused halt near Plessey village, in Northumberland
 Plessey Woods Country Park, near Plessey village, in Northumberland

See also
 Plessey v Ferguson
 Pleshey
 Plassey (disambiguation)